Deoband is one of the 403 constituencies of the Uttar Pradesh Legislative Assembly, India. It is a part of the Saharanpur district and one of five assembly constituencies in the Saharanpur Lok Sabha constituency. Since 2008, this assembly constituency is numbered 5 amongst 403 constituencies. Prior to 2008, when the "Delimitation of Parliamentary and Assembly Constituencies Order, 2008" came into effect, this constituency was number 400.

On 16 March 2017, newly elected MLA Brijesh Singh announced he intended to rename the constituency Dev-vrand.

Wards / Areas
The Deoband assembly constituency comprises the following Wards / areas.

Members of the Legislative Assembly

Election results

2022

2017
17th Vidhan Sabha: 2017 Assembly Elections.

16th Vidhan Sabha: 2012 General Elections
Source:

15th Vidhan Sabha: 2007 Assembly Elections.

 
 
 
 
 
 
 
 
 
Source:

See also

Deoband
Government of Uttar Pradesh
List of Vidhan Sabha constituencies of Uttar Pradesh
Uttar Pradesh
Uttar Pradesh Legislative Assembly

References

External links
 

Assembly constituencies of Uttar Pradesh
Politics of Saharanpur district
Constituencies established in 1951
1951 establishments in Uttar Pradesh
Deoband